Ambulyx jordani is a species of moth of the  family Sphingidae. It is known from Papua New Guinea.

Ambulyx Bhutana [18-01-1998]

References

Ambulyx
Moths described in 1910
Moths of New Guinea